Drita Islami (born 1 August 1996) is a Macedonian hurdler of Albanian descendent. She competed at the 2016 Summer Olympics in the women's 400 metres hurdles race; her time of 1:01.18 in the heats did not qualify her for the semifinals.

Drita Islami is the national record holder of North Macedonia in the 400 metres hurdles.

References

1996 births
Living people
Macedonian female athletes
Olympic athletes of North Macedonia
Athletes (track and field) at the 2016 Summer Olympics
Albanians in North Macedonia
European Games competitors for North Macedonia
Athletes (track and field) at the 2015 European Games
Athletes (track and field) at the 2018 Mediterranean Games
Mediterranean Games competitors for North Macedonia